Bikchagul (Biksağıl) is a rural locality (a village) in Aksyonovsky Selsoviet, Alsheyevsky District, Bashkortostan, Russia. The population was 114 as of 2010. There are 2 streets.

Geography 
Bikchagul is located 29 km southwest of Rayevsky (the district's administrative centre) by road. Khanzharovo is the nearest rural locality.

References 

Rural localities in Alsheyevsky District